is a magical girl anime television series by Toei Animation. It aired from 15 February 1980 to 27 February 1981 on TV Asahi.

A 15-minute film called  was released in Japan on July 12, 1980.

Story
Lalabel is a magical girl who lives happily in the magic world, until the day she sees the thief Biscus stealing all the magic tools. Startled by her sudden appearance, Biscus swings his magic wand around with dismay. They fall into the human world under the influence of the wand's magic power. Unconscious, Lalabel is found by an elderly couple, the Tachibanas. They take her home, and upon finding out that she is an orphan, decide to let her stay with them. Lalabel decides to stay until she can capture Biscus. She attends school with Teko, the granddaughter of the Tachibanas, and Toko. She slowly develops a sense of humor and pathos, and finds herself falling in love. Whenever Lalabel sees Biscus performing his bad deeds, she has to stop him and writes proverbs related to the events of the day in her diary.

In the human world, Lalabel discovers fascinating aspects of human beings and finds herself happy there. In the last episode, after the last battle between Lalabel and Biscus, both magic cases are emptied of magic items and vanish, rendering both of them completely human. The villains reform and promise not to bother Lalabel or any of her friends anymore.

Characters
Lalabel - The main character, a magical girl from the magic world. One night, while she is sleeping, her magical items wake her up, and she sees Biscus stealing two magical briefcases. After being pulled to Earth by Biscus, she is adopted by the Tachibanas and decides to stay until she returns  home.
Biscus - A very fat thief of and the main antagonist. He stole two magical briefcases from the magical realm  Lalabel lived in, but after being surprised by Lalabel, he transports the two of them to Earth, losing one of the briefcases in the process. While on Earth, he shacks up with a ramen stand owner, Hokiba, who is as greedy and nasty as himself. He tries to swindle people with his (stolen) magic powers while trying to steal Lalabel's briefcase. He has a grey cat as nasty and horrid as himself. 
The Tachibanas - The kind old couple who let Lalabel stay with them. Mrs. Tachibana is the typical kindly grandmother figure, and made Lalabel's signature pink dress. Mr. Tachibana is cynical and does not like magic. After Lalabel saves him from drowning, he starts to warm up to her and her magic. He is the one who comes up with the proverbs Lalabel writes.
Teko - The granddaughter of the Tachibanas and Lalabel's friends, who lives with her grandparents due to her parents working overseas.
Toko - One of Lalabel and Teko's friends.
Hokiba - Biscus' sidekick.
Tsubomi - The rich girl in Lalabel, Teko, and Toko's class. She has a snobbish attitude towards Teko and Toko and uses her privilege to get her way. Lalabel saved her from being hit by her father's construction vehicles that were ignoring a sidewalk Lalabel and friends use to get to school.

Theme songs
The opening theme Hello Lalabel and the ending theme Mahou Shōjo Lalabel are sung by Mitsuko Horie.

References

External links
Lalabel Official website from Toei Animation 

1980 anime films
1980 anime television series debuts
1980s animated short films
1981 Japanese television series endings
Anime short films
Anime television films
Animated films based on animated series
Magical girl anime and manga
Shōjo manga
Toei Animation television
TV Asahi original programming
Toei Animation films